Henry Tazewell (November 27, 1753January 24, 1799) was an American politician who was instrumental in the early government of Virginia, and a US senator from Virginia. He was also a slave owner. Tazewell served as President pro tempore of the United States Senate in 1795.

Early life
Born in Brunswick County, Virginia, Tazewell was the son of Littleton and Mary Gray Tazewell. He attended the rural schools and graduated from the College of William and Mary at Williamsburg, Virginia, in 1770.

He married Dorothea Elizabeth Waller on January 13, 1774, who were the parents of Littleton Waller Tazewell, who became a senator and governor of Virginia, and a daughter, Sophia Ann.

Career
Tazewell studied law, was admitted to the bar in 1773, and began his practice. During the American Revolutionary War, he raised and was commissioned captain of a troop of cavalry.

A member of the House of Burgesses in 1775, Tazewell was also a delegate to the Fourth Virginia Convention of 1775 and the Fifth Virginia Convention of 1776, which wrote the state constitution. From 1778 to 1785, he was a member of the Virginia General Assembly.

In 1785, Tazewell became a judge of the Virginia General Court. Elevated to its chief justice, he served from 1789 to 1793.  He also served as a judge on the Virginia Supreme Court of Appeals, later renamed the Virginia Supreme Court, in 1793.

In 1794, Tazewell was elected to the US Senate to fill the vacancy that had been caused by the resignation of John Taylor. Re-elected in 1798, he served from December 29, 1794, to his death. He served as the president pro tempore of the Senate in 1795.

When Tennessee Senator William Blount was impeached on account of treason in 1797, Tazewell cast the lone dissenting vote against Blount's expulsion from the Senate.

Death
Tazewell died in Philadelphia, Pennsylvania, on January 24, 1799, and is interred at Christ Church Burial Ground.

Tazewell County, Virginia; Tazewell, Virginia; Tazewell, Tennessee; and possibly Tazewell County, Illinois are named after him.

See also
 List of United States Congress members who died in office (1790–1899)

References

External links

United States senators from Virginia
Presidents pro tempore of the United States Senate
Justices of the Supreme Court of Virginia
House of Burgesses members
1753 births
1799 deaths
People from Brunswick County, Virginia
College of William & Mary alumni
Burials at Christ Church, Philadelphia
18th-century American politicians
Virginia colonial people
Tazewell family
American slave owners